Bactria ( Bāxtriš) was a satrapy of the Achaemenid Empire. It was conquered between 545–540 BC by Cyrus the Great.

Bactria is attested in 520 BC at the Behistun inscription. Bactria was a special satrapy in that it was ruled by a crown prince or an intended heir. The capital of Bactria was Bactra, and the region also sometimes included Sogdia. During the reign of Darius the Great, the Bactrians and the Aeglians were placed in one tax district, which was supposed to pay 360 talents every year.

See also
Bactria

References

Sources
 

Achaemenid satrapies
Bactria